The South East Handball Association League, or simply the SEHA League, is a regional men's club handball league in Southeast Europe, featuring teams from Croatia, Hungary, North Macedonia, Serbia and Slovakia. Due to sponsorship reasons, the league is also known as the Gazprom League (or the Gazprom South Stream League earlier). The league exists alongside scaled-down national leagues of the participating nations and all of SEHA League teams join their respective country's own competitions in late spring after the SEHA League regular season and post-season have been completed. The league's headquarters are in Zagreb, Croatia, and the league's president is Božidar Đurković. 2011–12 was the first season of the competition, with Vardar from Skopje becoming the first champions.

History of the league

The initiative for establishing the regional South-East European handball league was presented during the first half of 2011. After the idea of forming a Regional Sparkasse League failed, during July 2011 it was agreed that the first season of the SEHA League would start in September of the same year. In the first season of SEHA League, 12 clubs took part, but their number reduced during the following years. In the 2020–21 season, there are 10 clubs from 7 countries.

The league is based on a regular season and the Final Four, in which the four best placed clubs from the regular season participate. The most successful participants of the SEHA League during its first eight seasons is Vardar with five titles. Vardar became the first team with more than one title when it won the 2013–14 edition.

During the 2021–22, season was interrupted after Russian invasion of Ukraine, which led Motor Zaporizhzhia left the league, and Meshkov Brest being suspended. Siniša Ostoić, managing director, confirmed that the next season will not include teams from Belarus and Ukraine. Also European Handball Federation suspended both Russia and Belarus national teams and clubs, meaning there are not able to play any competitive game with other EHF members. The following season these clubs founded its own Eastern Division.

2022–23 season

Below is the list of clubs that are members of the 2022–23 SEHA League season.

Final Four tournaments

Results by season

Below is the list of winners, finalists and other participants of the Final Four SEHA tournaments.

Hosts

Records and statistics

By club

By country

Participating clubs

Correct as of the 2022–23 SEHA League season. Bold indicates the winning years.

References

External links

Official website

 
Handball leagues in Europe
Handball leagues in Bosnia and Herzegovina
Handball competitions in Croatia
Handball competitions in North Macedonia
Handball leagues in Montenegro
Handball competitions in Serbia
Handball in Slovakia
Handball in Belarus
Handball competitions in Romania
Handball competitions in Ukraine
Professional sports leagues in Belarus
Professional sports leagues in China
Professional sports leagues in Russia
Professional sports leagues in Ukraine
Multi-national professional sports leagues